"Something Ventured" is a 2011 documentary film investigating the emergence of American venture capitalism in the mid-20th century. Something Ventured follows the stories of the venture capitalists who worked with entrepreneurs to start and build companies like Apple, Intel, Genentech, Cisco, Atari, Tandem, and others, and looks at the influence of Georges Doriot. It is a full-length independent film which includes interviews with prominent American venture capitalists and entrepreneurs of the 1960s, 1970s and 1980s, as well as archival photography and footage. The film has aired across the US on local PBS stations as well as on public television in Norway.

Something Ventured features the venture capitalists Arthur Rock, Tom Perkins, Don Valentine, Dick Kramlich, Reid Dennis, Bill Draper, Pitch Johnson, Bill Bowes, Bill Edwards, and Jim Gaither. The entrepreneurs featured in Something Ventured are Gordon Moore (co-founder of Intel), Jimmy Treybig (founder of Tandem), Nolan Bushnell (founder of Atari), Dr. Herbert Boyer (co-founder of Genentech), Mike Markkula (second president/CEO of Apple), Sandy Lerner (co-founder of Cisco), John Morgridge (early CEO of Cisco), and Robert Campbell (founder of what would become PowerPoint).

Something Ventured premiered at the South by Southwest Film Festival in March 2011. The film was co-executive produced by Paul Holland and Molly Davis (of Rainmaker Communications). Something Ventured was directed by Emmy Award-winning filmmakers Dan Geller and Dayna Goldfine (co-directors of "Ballets Russes.) Something Ventured’s North American distribution partner is Zeitgeist Films.

Press 
 'Something Ventured' April 24, 2011. San Francisco Chronicle
 'Something Ventured' KQED Radio. April 22, 2011
 When Venture Capital Was an Adventure Inc. April 22, 2011.
 'Something Ventured' tells story of tech investors San Francisco Chronicle. April 18, 2011
  Fox Business. April 14, 2011.
 SXSW Reviews-Something Ventured Variety. April 3, 2011
 Holland Says New Film Features Early Venture Capitalists: Video Bloomberg Television. March 18, 2011
 A Risk Worth Taking The Dylan Ratigan Show. March 15, 2011
 SXSW: "Something Ventured" Directors Talk Venture Capital Early Days TechNewsDaily. March 15, 2011
 The Good Guys in Business CNBC. March, 14th, 2011
 Talking with the Directors of 'Something Ventured' NBC. Austin, Texas. March 12, 2011
 Veni Vidi Venture: The unlikely heroes of big business The Austin Chronicle. March 11, 2011

External links 
 Official webpage
 

Documentary films about computer and internet entrepreneurs
2011 films
American documentary films
2011 documentary films
Documentary films about business
2010s English-language films
2010s American films